C. miniata  may refer to:
 Calostoma miniata, a mushroom species found in China
 Castilleja miniata, the giant red Indian paintbrush, a flowering plant species native to western North America
 Cephalopholis miniata, the vermillion seabass or coral hind, a fish species
 Clivia miniata, the kaffir lily or bush lily, a plant species from South Africa
 Coelogyne miniata, an orchid species
 Cucumaria miniata, the orange sea cucumber, an echinoderm species

See also
 Miniata